The Undyulyung (Ündülüŋ) is a river in Sakha Republic (Yakutia), Russia. There are no settlements close to the river.

A great number of fish species are found in the waters of the Undyulyung, including lenok, taimen, whitefish, perch, grayling, pike, ide, as well as the endangered Lena sturgeon. The river is a suitable destination for rafting.

History
On 11 September 1986 a meteorite fell at the mouth of the Byukyakh (Бюкээх), a right tributary of the Undyulyung. The fall was observed by a helicopter crew.

Course
The Undyulyung is a right tributary of the Lena. Its source is located in the southern sector of the Orulgan Range, west of the Echysky Massif. Its valley flanks the southern end of the Byrandia Range in its upper course and the southern side of the Kuyellyakh Range further downstream. In its first section the river flows across mountainous terrain forming rapids. After leaving the mountains it flows into the Central Yakutian Lowland, splitting into two arms shortly before it joins the right bank of the Lena  from its mouth. The river is surrounded by mountain tundra with shrub thickets and subalpine forests landscapes in its upper reaches. In its lower course there are sparse forests with Dahurian larch.

The river freezes in October and stays under ice until May. Floods are common in the summer season.

See also
List of rivers of Russia

References

External links 
 Downriver Undyulyung - Hidden Siberia

Rivers of the Sakha Republic
Verkhoyansk Range
Central Yakutian Lowland